The 2017–18 Bradley Braves women's basketball team represents Bradley University during the 2017–18 NCAA Division I women's basketball season. The Braves are led by second year head coach Andrea Gorski. The Braves are members of the Missouri Valley Conference and play their home games at Renaissance Coliseum. They finished the season 13–18, 6–12 in MVC play to finish in seventh place. They advanced to the quarterfinals of the Missouri Valley women's tournament where they lost to Missouri State.

Roster

Schedule

|-
! colspan="9" style=|  Exhibition

|-
! colspan="9" style=|  Non-conference regular season

|-
! colspan="12" style=| Missouri Valley Conference regular season

|-
! colspan="9" style=| Missouri Valley Women's Tournament

See also
2017–18 Bradley Braves men's basketball team

References

2017-18
2017–18 Missouri Valley Conference women's basketball season
2018 in sports in Illinois
2017 in sports in Illinois